Tarmonbarry, officially Termonbarry, is a village in County Roscommon, Ireland. It is located where the N5 National primary route crosses the River Shannon. East of the bridge, part of the village lies in County Longford. As of the 2016 census, the population of the village was 443 people. The village is a few kilometres west of the county town of Longford, near Strokestown and Roosky.

History and development

The village originates from an abbey founded by saint Berach in the 6th century—the name of the village in Irish means roughly "Berach's sanctuary". 
Berach is the patron saint of Termonbarry.

Termonbarry has a boutique hotel with a restaurant and pub, several bars and restaurants, shops, a petrol station, a marina, a disused Garda station, a GAA pitch, and an art gallery.

Sport

Gaelic games
St Barrys is the name of the local Gaelic football club, which takes members from Tarmonbarry, Whitehall and the Scramogue region. The club's colours are green and white.

Boat racing
For a period of about ten years from 1925–1935, Tarmonbarry was a centre for hydroplane racing in Ireland, due to the water of the Shannon which was relatively calm. This activity declined due to the high cost of running and maintaining the boats.

See also
 List of towns and villages in Ireland

References

Towns and villages in County Roscommon
Civil parishes of County Roscommon